The 2002 European Cup was the 23rd edition of the European Cup of athletics.

The Super League Finals were held in Annecy, France.

Super League

Held on 22 and 23 June in Annecy, France

Team standings

Italy kept its position in the women's Super League as the host of the next edition. Top six teams qualified for the 2003 European Indoor Cup.

Results summary

Men's events

Women's events

First League
The First League was held on 22 and 23 June

Men

Group A
Held in Banská Bystrica, Slovakia

Group B
Held in Seville, Spain

Women

Group A
Held in Banská Bystrica, Slovakia

Group B
Held in Seville, Spain

The winner of each group also qualified for the 2003 European Indoor Cup.

Second League
The Second League was held on 22 and 23 June

Men

Group A
Held in Tallinn, Estonia

Group B
Held in Belgrade, Yugoslavia

Women

Group A
Held in Tallinn, Estonia

Group B
Held in Belgrade, Yugoslavia

References

External links
European Cup results (Men) from GBR Athletics
European Cup results (Women) from GBR Athletics

European Cup (athletics)
European Cup
European Cup
International athletics competitions hosted by France